Rhigioglossa is a genus of horse flies in the family Tabanidae.

Species
Rhigioglossa algoensis (Oldroyd, 1957)
Rhigioglossa andrewesi Chainey, 1987
Rhigioglossa anomala (Oldroyd, 1957)
Rhigioglossa apiformis (Neave, 1915)
Rhigioglossa araucana (Coscarón, 1972)
Rhigioglossa argentea (Oldroyd, 1957)
Rhigioglossa atrata (Schuurmans Stekhoven, 1926)
Rhigioglossa aurantiaca (Oldroyd, 1957)
Rhigioglossa barbata (Bigot, 1892)
Rhigioglossa barnardi (Oldroyd, 1957)
Rhigioglossa callosa (Ricardo, 1920)
Rhigioglossa capensis Chainey, 1987
Rhigioglossa confluens (Loew, 1858)
Rhigioglossa constrictifrons (Oldroyd, 1957)
Rhigioglossa contraria (Austen, 1937)
Rhigioglossa coriaria (Oldroyd, 1957)
Rhigioglossa costata (Loew, 1860)
Rhigioglossa cuneata (Loew, 1858)
Rhigioglossa cuprea (Trojan, 2002)
Rhigioglossa cydistra (Taylor, 1918)
Rhigioglossa decora (Macquart, 1850)
Rhigioglossa demeijerei (Ricardo, 1913)
Rhigioglossa designata (Oldroyd, 1957)
Rhigioglossa dimidiata (Wulp, 1869)
Rhigioglossa divergens (Oldroyd, 1957)
Rhigioglossa doddi (Ricardo, 1915)
Rhigioglossa edentula (Wiedemann, 1828)
Rhigioglossa fallax (Austen, 1912)
Rhigioglossa femoralis (Ricardo, 1913)
Rhigioglossa flavibasalis Chainey, 1987
Rhigioglossa flavipes (Hine, 1923)
Rhigioglossa fuliginosa (Taylor, 1916)
Rhigioglossa hirsuta (Ricardo, 1920)
Rhigioglossa hoffeinsorum (Trojan, 2002)
Rhigioglossa imitator (Ferguson, 1921)
Rhigioglossa ismayi (Chainey, 1989)
Rhigioglossa kiboriani (Lamerton, 1964)
Rhigioglossa latifrons (Mackerras, 1961)
Rhigioglossa lineacallosa Chainey, 1987
Rhigioglossa longipennis (Séguy, 1950)
Rhigioglossa lurida (Walker, 1848)
Rhigioglossa mansoni (Summers, 1912)
Rhigioglossa marieps (Usher, 1965)
Rhigioglossa milleri Chainey, 1987
Rhigioglossa montana (Ricardo, 1917)
Rhigioglossa monticola (Neave, 1915)
Rhigioglossa montonenae Taylor & Chainey, 1994
Rhigioglossa mossambicensis (Dias, 1955)
Rhigioglossa munroi Chainey, 1987
Rhigioglossa namaquina (Oldroyd, 1957)
Rhigioglossa namibiensis Chainey, 1987
Rhigioglossa nigerrima (Mackerras, 1961)
Rhigioglossa nigricans (Loew, 1858)
Rhigioglossa nitens Chainey, 1987
Rhigioglossa norrisi (Mackerras, 1961)
Rhigioglossa nyassica (Enderlein, 1922)
Rhigioglossa obutundata (Oldroyd, 1957)
Rhigioglossa oritensis (Bigot, 1892)
Rhigioglossa paralurida (Ferguson & Henry, 1920)
Rhigioglossa provincialis (Oldroyd, 1957)
Rhigioglossa pusilla (Schiner, 1868)
Rhigioglossa redunda (Oldroyd, 1957)
Rhigioglossa rubricornis (Kröber, 1930)
Rhigioglossa seyrigi (Séguy, 1950)
Rhigioglossa smaragdops Manning, 1991
Rhigioglossa stannusi (Oldroyd, 1957)
Rhigioglossa stigmatica (Trojan, 2002)
Rhigioglossa stradbrokei (Taylor, 1917)
Rhigioglossa sulcifrons (Ferguson, 1921)
Rhigioglossa tepperi (Ferguson, 1921)
Rhigioglossa tinleyi (Usher, 1965)
Rhigioglossa turneri (Austen, 1937)
Rhigioglossa vittata (Ricardo, 1913)
Rhigioglossa yantarophila (Trojan, 2002)

References

Tabanidae
Brachycera genera
Diptera of Australasia
Diptera of Africa
Diptera of South America
Taxa named by Christian Rudolph Wilhelm Wiedemann